Cubitofusa is a genus of moths belonging to the family Tineidae.

Species
Cubitofusa pseudoglebata (Gozmány, 1967) (from Congo, Rwanda)
Cubitofusa seydeli (Gozmány, 1967) (from Congo)

References
 Afromoths

Tineidae
Tineidae genera